Finals is a 2019 Indian Malayalam-language sports drama directed by Arun P. R. The film stars Rajisha Vijayan, Suraj Venjaramoodu and Niranj Maniyanpilla Raju. The film is based on real life athletes.

Premise
Alice, an elite cyclist, trains for the 2020 Summer Olympics along with her father, Varghese, and childhood friend, Manuel.

Cast 
 Rajisha Vijayan as Alice
 Suraj Venjaramoodu as Varghese (Alice's father) 
 Niranj Maniyanpilla Raju as Manuel Thomas
 Tini Tom as Thomas
 Maniyan Pilla Raju as Sports Minister Siva Shankara Pillai
 Nisthar Sait as 	Rama Seshan
 Kunjan as Azees
 Mala Parvathi 
 Muthumani as Vardha
 Sona Nair as Mini
 Dhruvan as Aadhi (cameo appearance)
 Milkha Singh As Himself (Cameo Appearance)

Music 
The songs were composed by Kailas Menon.

Release 
The Times of India gave the film a rating of three-and-half out of five stars and wrote that "The best part about Finals is how Arun succeeds to keep the audience guessing. Just when you think that the film will choose a predictable path, he somehow delightfully veers away". The New Indian Express gave the film a rating of four out of five stars and wrote that "Finals is, without a doubt, the best of all the four Onam releases. After being underwhelmed by the other three, I wanted an experience that’s the equivalent of finding water in the middle of a scorching desert".

References

External links 

2010s Malayalam-language films
2010s sports drama films
Indian sports drama films
Films scored by Kailas Menon